Fusca of Ravenna is a child martyr killed ca. 250 AD in Ravenna, Italy under the persecutions of Decius. Her nurse, Marura, was martyred with her. She is venerated as a saint by the Roman Catholic Church.

The presence of a column painting of the saint at the Church of the Nativity, in Bethlehem has provoked scholarly interest.

Notes

Christian child saints
3rd-century Christian martyrs